York International 9s is an international rugby league nines tournament taking place in York, England. It is held at Heworth ARLC's Elmpark Way ground on the north east side of the city. The 2007 tournament took place on Saturday 14 July.

The tournament was first held in 2002 as part of City of York Council's Queen's Golden Jubilee celebrations. The competition was awarded a 5* rating from the Rugby League European Federation and was the first nines event in Europe.

The tournament last took place in 2009.

Format

The 2007 event has been streamlined with all the competitions taking place on one day rather than two, and eight teams, rather than 12, competing in the Fairfax Cup. The new competition format has the eight teams split into two pools of four, with the top two from each group qualifying for the semi-finals. The bottom two in each group will compete in play-offs to determine finishing positions fifth to eighth.  In 2009 the RFL invited the Combined Services Referees Society to send officials from all three services to participate. On the day, five officials took part including one who flew in from Germany alongside officials from the RFL.

Teams taking part

Fairfax Cup
Group 1: York City Knights, York Ironsides, Espagne Origine, Lyon-Villeurbanne-Rhone
Group 2: Dewsbury Rams, The Army, FC Lézignan XIII, The Ambassadors

Archbishop Dolben Cup
Group 1: Police Sport UK, Beach Boys, York RUFC, Royal Navy
Group 2: Featherstone Rovers, Royal Air Force, York Tigers, Broughton Rangers

Trophies

Teams from England, France and in previous years from Russia compete for the Fairfax Cup, named after Sir Thomas Fairfax. In recent years, this has recently begun to feature professional teams from the National Leagues.

First competed for in 2006, the Archbishop Dolben cup is competed for by "development teams" that are not considered strong enough to take part in the main Fairfax cup. Many of the teams represent the military services of the UK.

There is also a junior grade Marston Moor competition for York and District schools. It is named after the English Civil War battle between Cavaliers and Roundheads. Preliminary rounds will take place on Wednesday 14 June at Heworth Rugby Club. The semi finals and final will then be part of the York International 9s Festival. From 2007, the competition will be expanded to include secondary schools.

Past winners

Fairfax cup
 2002 London KooGas
 2003 Lezignan - Corbieres XIII
 2004 West Indies Wahoos
 2005 East Hull
 2006 York City Knights
 2007 The Ambassadors
 2008 York Ironsides
 2009 Police Sport UK

Archbishop Dolben cup
 2006 Police Sport UK
 2007 Police Sport UK
 2008 Fife Lions
 2009 Royal Dragoon Guards

Marston Moor cup
 2002 Ralph Butterfield Primary School
 2003 St. Oswalds Primary School
 2004 Ralph Butterfield Primary School
 2005 Wigginton Primary School
 2006 Woodthorpe Primary School
 2007 Year 6: Clifton Without Junior School, Year 7: Canon Lee School, Year 8: King James School, Year 9: Barlby High School, Year 10: Joseph Rowntree School
 2008

See also

 Middlesex 9s

References

External links
 Official site
 York 9s on What's on in York

School sport in the United Kingdom
Sport in York
Rugby league nines competitions in the United Kingdom
Youth sport in England